This is a list of colleges and universities operated or sponsored by Baptist organizations. Many of these organizations are members of the International Association of Baptist Colleges and Universities (IABCU), which has 47 member schools in 16 states, including 44 colleges and universities, 2 Bible schools, and 1 theological seminary.

Currently affiliated
Institutions associated with or operated by Baptist organizations include:

Closed

Formerly affiliated

Works cited

See also
 Southern Baptist-related schools, colleges and universities

References

External links
 International Association of Baptist Colleges and Universities
 Baptist colleges associated with the Southern Baptist Convention

 United States
 List
Baptist